Anguix is a municipality and town located in the province of Burgos, Castile and León, Spain. In 2019 the municipality had a population of 136 inhabitants.

References 

Municipalities in the Province of Burgos